Franco Agamenone and Fernando Romboli were the defending champions but chose not to defend their title.

Luis David Martínez and Gonçalo Oliveira won the title after defeating Rafael Matos and Felipe Meligeni Alves 7–5, 6–1 in the final.

Seeds

Draw

References

External links
 Main draw

Challenger de Santiago - Doubles
2021 Doubles